Kirksey is an unincorporated community in Calloway County, Kentucky, United States.  The post office was established on July 14, 1871, by Stephen Franklin Kirksey.  Post Master Kirksey used the same building for a post office that had served as a post office from 1857 to 1860 that was known at the time as Radford, Kentucky.  Post Master Kirksey submitted his own name to the U.S. Post Office instead of the names Reedville and Rosedale which were preferred by the residents in the area.

References

Unincorporated communities in Calloway County, Kentucky
Unincorporated communities in Kentucky